Forth is a village in South Lanarkshire, Scotland with a population of around 3,500 people. It is situated near Lanark, and stands 1,000 feet (320 metres) above sea level.

History
The town of Forth is thought to take its name from the meaning "the open air". The town itself is first mentioned in a great seal charter of 1599. The first jobs available in the town of Forth were thought to be handloom weavers who, after an increase in the towns capacity to 170, were replaced by different trades such as ironstone, limestone and coalminers. The latter trades contribute to why it is known as a mining village.

Amongst the historic buildings in the village, Forth Parish Church was built in 1875 and the stone used was quarried directly from nearby Hailstonegreen. The first Police Station in Forth was opened in 1886 and is now home to the local Health Clinic.

The main street garage which still stands today was first opened in the same spot back in 1926 by Sanny Griffin.

Forth Railway Station at Wilsontown was built in 1867. This proved a great success and helped the town move forward. This, however became obsolete in coming years and was eventually closed in the 1950s.

The War had a devastating effect on the town of Forth: forty-nine men from Forth lost their lives. This number is even more significant when you take into consideration that the combined population of Forth was just 1000.

Some traditions from the past are still going today. In 1932, the first "Queen of Heather" was crowned, and this tradition became part of a Gala day for the town of Forth and has continued until this present day.

Black Law Wind Farm, once the largest on-land windfarm in Britain, is situated in an area bounded by the nearby hamlet of Climpy, and the moorland outskirts of Carluke and Shotts.

Forth is host to an annual Music Festival called the Gentle Giant Music Festival, named after George Gracie.

Facilities

Education
Forth has a small nursery and primary school and this feeds to Carluke High School.
There is a small library attached to the school which is home to several clubs such as a book club for the younger children on Tuesdays. Additionally, there is a youth club held for primary children on a Friday night and for older children on a Monday night.

Sports
One of the main facilities in Forth is the Sports Centre.

The Centre runs a number of different classes for all ages. There are fitness classes for adults - including gym circuit and body combat classes. There is also a creche for the children of those who wish to use the facilities. Older children can attend classes such as trampolining and gymnastics. There is a gym which is open to everybody aged 14 and over. The halls are available to let out for special occasions; such as parties and conferences.

There are a number of football pitches in Forth. There are lighted pitches, which are free for young children and can be leased by adults. There are also a number of parks where anybody can play for free. Additionally, the local football team, Forth Wanderers own a pitch where they play home matches and have their training sessions.

At the other end of the town, there is a bowling club named Forth & Wilsontown Bowling Club.

Shopping
There are a number of shops in Forth. These include:
The Co-op mini supermarket; a McColls general store; U Save newsagent and grocery shop;  Gillespies butcher shop; A motor bike and quad shop, Sam Dornan's Car Sales; A & C Ross garage and shop; and a Breast Cancer Care charity shop.

Food
There are a number of places to eat out in Forth as well as a number to get a takeaway including Roccos chip shop, and Wongs Cuisine. Additionally,  The Inns on the Main Street offer bar meals.

Others
The Haven is a local charity supporting the community of Forth & rural Clydesdale. The Haven offers support to families affected by a life limiting condition such as Cancer, Multiple Sclerosis, Motor Neurone Disease, Huntington's Disease, Parkinson's Disease and Dementia. Support is provided by highly experienced Nurses, Therapists and Volunteers.

Forth also has a doctors' surgery and a chemist.

Boys' Brigade and Girls' Association
The village also has a Boys' Brigade company, 1st Forth. The company has an anchor section for primary 1–3, a junior section for primary 4-6 and a company section for primary 7 and upwards. Since the BB headquarters passed that companies can now accept girls and so the company now has a Girls' Association that meets at the same time as the boys. The company and junior sections meet on a Thursday night and the anchor section meets on a Friday night.

The company always turns out for the annual Remembrance day parade in November and Escort the banner at the Gala Day. The company also provides the guard of honour to the Gala Court when possible.

Transport
There is an hourly bus service run by Stuart's to Lanark, and the Blue Bus Company run a bus to Livingston several times a day.

Noted Residents
Famous or noted residents who have lived in, or were born, in Forth include George Gracie who was included in the Guinness Book of Records as Scotland's tallest man, and footballer Willie Waddell. Also Billy Ritchie, known as Rock music's first lead keyboard player and member of pioneering 60s/70s band Clouds.
Crawford Robertson, guitarist of the band Violet Tides.

See also
 List of places in South Lanarkshire

References

External links

 Census 2001 statistics for Forth
 Welcome to Forth District
 Forth District Website Update on the mutual link

Villages in South Lanarkshire